Chris Turner may refer to:

Sports
 Chris Turner (American football) (born 1987), American football quarterback
 Chris Turner (baseball) (born 1969), American baseball player
 Chris Turner (footballer, born 1951) (1951–2015), English football player and manager Cambridge United of Peterborough United
 Chris Turner (footballer, born 1958), English football player and manager of Sheffield Wednesday
 Chris Turner (footballer, born 1959), New Zealand international football player
 Chris Turner (footballer, born 1987), Northern Irish football player
 Chris Turner (footballer, born 1990), English football player
 Chris Turner (soccer) (born 1960), retired Canadian soccer goalkeeper
 Chris Turner (speedway rider) (born 1958), English speedway rider

Other
 Chris Turner (author) (born 1973), Canadian writer
 Chris Turner (Louisiana politician), Louisiana politician
 Chris Turner (Texas politician) (born 1972), Texas politician

See also
 Christopher Turner (disambiguation)
 Christopher Turnor (disambiguation)
 Kriss Turner, American screenwriter and producer